Mabrouk or alternatively Mabrook, is a vernacular Arabic interjection meaning "blessed". It is also an expression for congratulation. It may refer to:

Given name
Ali Mabrouk El Zaidi, a Libyan long-distance runner
Mabrouk El Mechri, Tunisian director, screenwriter and actor
Mabrouk Mubarak Salim, State Minister of Sudan's Ministry of Transport and roads
Mabrouk Zaid, Saudi Arabian football player

Surname
Ahmad Salama Mabrouk, Egyptian leader
Alim Ben Mabrouk, Algerian footballer
Belal Mabrouk, Egyptian handball player
Del Mabrouk (born 1934), American contemporary poet, writer, photographer
Hédi Mabrouk (1921–2000), Tunisian diplomat and politician
Fathi Mabrouk, Egyptian football midfielder
Juanita Mabrouk (1904–1999), American painter, and taxidermist
Marwan Mabrouk, Libyan footballer
Mehdi Mabrouk, Tunisian politician
Mourad El Mabrouk, Tunisian basketball player
Néjia Ben Mabrouk, Tunisian filmmaker
Patrick El Mabrouk, French runner

Geography
Mabrouk I, village in Mauritania
Mabrouk II, village in Mauritania
Mabroûk, Mali

Other
1000 Mabrouk, 2010 Egyptian film
"Mabrouk Aalik", a song in the album Bonjour
Groupe Mabrouk, Tunisian company